"Song of the Younger World" is the first segment of the thirty-fifth episode (the twentieth episode of the second season (1986–87) of the television series The Twilight Zone. This segment follows a forbidden love between two youths.

Plot
A young man named Tanner Smith, who is in a home for wayward boys, seeks out the superintendent's daughter Amy. Although it is forbidden, they begin to meet at night and talk about their dreams and aspirations. She brings him books from the library after he tells her about his fascinations with wolves and how enlightened they are. He gives her a pendant he stole when he was a pickpocket. Amy claims to not care about his past as she only knows that she loves him.

One night in the barn where they meet, they are caught by her father rolling in the hay. Tanner is beaten by her father. Her father threatens that if they meet ever again, he will kill Tanner. Amy is comforted by an old ragged man named Hoakie. Hoakie tends to Tanner's wounds and warns him to avoid Amy. He says that she's in the library and he goes to her. They talk about how to escape together. Amy has found a book that explains how to release two souls so they can come together in a "better world".

Amy attempts this "escape", but her father surprises her, takes the book from her, and burns it. Tanner hears howling from outside. He thinks it is Amy, escapes his room and meets her outside. She talks cryptically about knowing the right way to escape. They separate but she tells him not to worry.

Amy tells Hoakie to tell Tanner that she will meet him but will appear dead. However, she escapes to the other world without waiting for Tanner to get the message. Tanner finds Amy's body and thinks she committed suicide. Blaming her father, he assaults him, but he fights back and imprisons Tanner. Hoakie finds Tanner and tries to explain what Amy was doing and what he must do to join her. Amy's father decides to kill Tanner. He finds Hoakie in the prison and murders him. Tanner does as he is told, and Amy's father witnesses him leave the world. The scene fades to a forest, where two white wolves run alongside each other, one of which is wearing Amy's pendant.

External links
 

The Twilight Zone (1985 TV series season 2) episodes
1987 American television episodes
Fiction set in 1916
Television episodes about parallel universes

fr:L'Orée du monde